The 2020 Taipei Marathon, the 24th running of that city's premier long-distance race, was held on December 20, 2020. Around 28,000 people ran in the event, of whom 22,189 finished.

Kenyan long-distance runner Paul Lonyangata smashed the previous record by 2:09:18. Taiwanese runner Chou Ting-yin claimed the domestic title, and Tsao Chun-yu established the new women's national record.

Background 
The slogan of the race was "Dare To Breathe". It symbolizes under the COVID-19 pandemic, most road running races have been cancelled or postponed worldwide, although participants must wear a face mask and maintain a safety distance before the start, the Taipei Marathon took place as usual.

WA Label Road Races 
The 2020 Taipei Marathon has been recognized by the World Athletics as Bronze Label races.

Results

Marathon

Half marathon

References 

Taipei Marathon
Taipei
2020 in Taiwanese sport